Prunella is a genus of herbaceous plants in the family Lamiaceae, also known as self-heals, heal-all, or allheal for their use in herbal medicine.

Habitat
Most are native to Europe, Asia, and North Africa, but Prunella vulgaris (common self-heal) is Holarctic in distribution, occurring in North America as well, and is a common lawn weed. Prunellas are low-growing plants, and thrive in moist wasteland and grass, spreading rapidly to cover the ground. They are members of the mint family and have the square stem common to mints.

Biological descriptions
The common name "self-heal" derives from the use of some species to treat a range of minor disorders. Self-heal can be grown from seed, or by dividing clumps in spring or autumn.

Species
 Prunella albanica Pénzes – Albania
 Prunella × bicolor Beck – parts of Europe (P. grandiflora × P. laciniata)
 Prunella × codinae Sennen – Spain (P. hyssopifolia × P. laciniata)
 Prunella cretensis Gand. – Crete
 Prunella × gentianifolia Pau – Spain (P. hyssopifolia × P. vulgaris)
 Prunella grandiflora (L.) Scholler – central + southern Europe from Caucasus to Russia; Caucasus
 Prunella hyssopifolia L. – Spain, France, Italy, Morocco
 Prunella × intermedia Link – central + southwestern Europe (P. laciniata × P. vulgaris)
 Prunella laciniata (L.) L – central + southern Europe, North Africa, Middle East
 Prunella orientalis Bornm. – Turkey, Syria
 Prunella prunelliformis (Maxim.) Makino – Japan
 Prunella × surrecta Dumort. – central + southwestern Europe (P. grandiflora × P. vulgaris)
 Prunella vulgaris L. – widespread in Europe, North Africa, Asia, North America; naturalized in New Zealand, parts of South America

Subspecies are
 Prunella vulgaris ssp. aleutica (Fernald) Hultén – Aleutian selfheal
 Prunella vulgaris ssp. lanceolata (W. Bartram) Hultén – lance selfheal
 Prunella vulgaris ssp. vulgaris (L.) – common selfheal

Uses

Traditional medicine

In the Pacific Northwest, its juice was used by the Quinault and the Quileute on boils. They also used the whole plant to treat cuts and inflammations. Ointments can be made by fixing the plant with grease. Dried Prunella is used to make a herbal drink. Prunella is also used for halitosis, especially when combined with other herbs (e.g. perilla, field mint, etc.). Herbal tea for treating ozostomia caused by oral local lesion

Food uses
The mildly bitter leaves are also good as salad greens. Prunella species are used as food plants by the larvae of some Lepidoptera species including Coleophora albitarsella.

As a health supplement
Prunella vulgaris is used as an ingredient in some bodybuilding supplements.

References

 
Lamiaceae genera
Plants used in traditional Chinese medicine
Plants used in traditional Native American medicine
Taxa named by Carl Linnaeus